Rumson is a borough in Monmouth County, in the U.S. state of New Jersey, and is part of the New York Metropolitan Area. As of the 2020 United States census, the borough's population was 7,343, an increase of 221 (+3.1%) from the 2010 census count of 7,122, which in turn reflected a decline of 15 (−0.2%) from 7,137 in 2000.

Rumson was formed by an act of the New Jersey Legislature on March 15, 1907, from portions of Shrewsbury Township, based on results of a referendum held on June 18, 1907.

History
Legend has it that the borough's name is derived from early European settlers who bought the land from the local Lenape Native Americans in exchange for some rum. But as far back as 1663, long before the area was officially named Rumson, Native Americans called it "Navarumsunk". Over the years it has been shortened to "Rumson", though sources also talk of a Chief Alumson as a source of the name. Other names Rumson has been known by include Black Point, Port Washington and Oceanic.

Rumson was purchased by English settlers in pieces. The first purchase was dated January 25, 1665, and it included parts of Middletown. The rest of the area was purchased later that year.

Rumson is known for its many sprawling 19th-century estates located along the shores of the Navesink and Shrewsbury rivers and along historic Rumson Road, which serves as one of Rumson's main thoroughfares. Now an upscale suburb, Rumson was then a summer colony for wealthy New York bankers and industrialists. The oldest of Rumson's homes was the Tredwell House, named after a family that summered there for almost 100 years. The oldest part of the house was from 1670, and the estate once occupied . It was the second-oldest building in Monmouth County when it was destroyed by fire in June 2006.

The Lauriston Mansion, built in 1870 and listed on the National Register of Historic Places in 2002, is a  home constructed in the Colonial Revival style. Plans have been submitted to demolish the building, which the developer stated could not be renovated, and to replace it with townhomes that would include affordable housing, leading Preservation New Jersey to declare the home "endangered" as of 2020.

In the 19th century, Rumson's summer residents enjoyed many activities, such as swimming and boating in the adjacent Navesink River and the Atlantic Ocean, or taking wagon rides. In winter, residents used the river for ice boating.

Geography
According to the U.S. Census Bureau, the borough had a total area of 7.11 square miles (18.42 km2), including 5.07 square miles (13.12 km2) of land and 2.05 square miles (5.30 km2) of water (28.76%). It has a humid subtropical climate (Cfa) and average monthly temperatures range from 32.5 °F in January to 75.2 °F in July. 

Unincorporated communities, localities and place names located partially or completely within the township include East Oceanic, Elsemere, Oceanic, Rumson Bluffs, Rumson Hills and Waterloo.

The borough borders the Monmouth County municipalities of Fair Haven, Little Silver, Middletown Township, Monmouth Beach and Sea Bright.

Demographics

2010 census

The Census Bureau's 2006–2010 American Community Survey showed that (in 2010 inflation-adjusted dollars) median household income was $134,281 (with a margin of error of +/− $18,300) and the median family income was $157,188 (+/− $28,308). Males had a median income of $140,885 (+/− $25,278) versus $56,071 (+/− $16,014) for females. The per capita income for the borough was $79,388 (+/− $10,219). About 3.8% of families and 4.1% of the population were below the poverty line, including 6.1% of those under age 18 and none of those age 65 or over.

2000 census
As of the 2000 United States census there were 7,137 people, 2,452 households, and 1,988 families residing in the borough. The population density was 1,366.0 people per square mile (527.9/km2). There were 2,610 housing units at an average density of 499.5 per square mile (193.1/km2). The racial makeup of the borough was 97.77% White, 0.24% African American, 0.06% Native American, 1.06% Asian, 0.36% from other races, and 0.50% from two or more races. Hispanic or Latino of any race were 1.39% of the population.

There were 2,452 households, out of which 44.2% had children under the age of 18 living with them, 71.3% were married couples living together, 7.8% had a female householder with no husband present, and 18.9% were non-families. 16.8% of all households were made up of individuals, and 7.9% had someone living alone who was 65 years of age or older. The average household size was 2.91 and the average family size was 3.29.

In the borough the population was spread out, with 31.9% under the age of 18, 3.5% from 18 to 24, 26.6% from 25 to 44, 25.2% from 45 to 64, and 12.8% who were 65 years of age or older. The median resident age was 39.2 years old. The median age was 39 years. For every 100 females, there were 93.9 males. For every 100 females age 18 and over, there were 89.6 males.

The median income for a household in the borough was $120,865, and the median income for a family was $140,668. Males had a median income of $100,000 versus $47,260 for females. The per capita income for the borough was $73,692. About 3.4% of families and 3.2% of the population were below the poverty line, including 2.4% of those under age 18 and 0.7% of those age 65 or over.

Sports
The Seabright Lawn Tennis and Cricket Club, established in 1877, is the oldest continuously active tennis club in the United States.

Parks and recreation
Public parks consist of Meadowridge Park, Piping Rock Park, Riverside Park, Rogers Park, "Teddy's Playground" at Victory Park, and West Park. Teddy's Playground was named after Edward “Teddy” Hall Gmelich, a 1-1/2-year-old who loved going to the park, and had died from a disease that had spread to his heart. The Rumson Country Club is a consolidation of the Rumson Polo Club and the Meadow Yacht Club and the Sea Bright Yacht Club. Bingham Hall serves as a center for social gatherings, recreational activities, and fundraisers.

Government

Local government

Rumson is governed under the borough form of New Jersey municipal government, which is used in 218 municipalities (of the 564) statewide, making it the most common form of government in New Jersey. The governing body is comprised of the Mayor and the Borough Council, with all positions elected at-large on a partisan basis as part of the November general election. A Mayor is elected directly by the voters to a four-year term of office. The Borough Council is comprised of six members elected to serve three-year terms on a staggered basis, with two seats coming up for election each year in a three-year cycle. The Borough form of government used by Rumson is a "weak mayor / strong council" government in which council members act as the legislative body with the mayor presiding at meetings and voting only in the event of a tie. The mayor can veto ordinances subject to an override by a two-thirds majority vote of the council. The mayor makes committee and liaison assignments for council members, and most appointments are made by the mayor with the advice and consent of the council.

, the Mayor of Rumson is Republican Joseph K. Hemphill, whose term of office ends on December 31, 2023. Members of the Borough Council are Council President John J. Conklin III (R, 2024), Gary Casazza (R, 2023), James Clayton Kingsbery (R, 2022), Michael F. Lospinuso (R, 2022; appointed to fill an unexpired term), Sarah Pomphrey (R, 2024) and Robert Swikart (R, 2023).

In January 2022, the Borough Council selected Michael F. Lospinuso from a list of three candidates nominated by the Republican municipal committee to fill the seat expiring in December 2022 that had been held by Laura R. Atwell until she resigned from office the previous December.

Councilmember Frank E. Shanley submitted a letter of resignation that took effect as of December 31, 2014, and was replaced in January 2015 by John J. Conklin III, who was selected by the Borough Council from a list of three candidates nominated by the Republican municipal committee.

In 2018, the borough had an average property tax bill of $20,602, the highest in the county, compared to an average bill of $8,767 statewide.

Federal, state, and county representation
Rumson is located in the 6th Congressional District and is part of New Jersey's 13th state legislative district.

Prior to the 2011 reapportionment following the 2010 Census, Rumson had been in the 11th state legislative district.

 

Monmouth County is governed by a Board of County Commissioners comprised of five members who are elected at-large to serve three year terms of office on a staggered basis, with either one or two seats up for election each year as part of the November general election. At an annual reorganization meeting held in the beginning of January, the board selects one of its members to serve as Director and another as Deputy Director. , Monmouth County's Commissioners are
Commissioner Director Thomas A. Arnone (R, Neptune City, term as commissioner and as director ends December 31, 2022), 
Commissioner Deputy Director Susan M. Kiley (R, Hazlet Township, term as commissioner ends December 31, 2024; term as deputy commissioner director ends 2022),
Lillian G. Burry (R, Colts Neck Township, 2023),
Nick DiRocco (R, Wall Township, 2022), and 
Ross F. Licitra (R, Marlboro Township, 2023). 
Constitutional officers elected on a countywide basis are
County clerk Christine Giordano Hanlon (R, 2025; Ocean Township), 
Sheriff Shaun Golden (R, 2022; Howell Township) and 
Surrogate Rosemarie D. Peters (R, 2026; Middletown Township).

Politics
As of March 2011, there were a total of 5,166 registered voters in Rumson, of which 953 (18.4%) were registered as Democrats, 1,827 (35.4%) were registered as Republicans and 2,383 (46.1%) were registered as Unaffiliated. There were three voters registered as Libertarians or Greens.

In the 2016 Presidential election in Rumson, Republican Donald J. Trump received 54.9% (2,131 votes cast) in contrast with Democrat Hillary Rodham Clinton's 41.0% (1,592 votes cast). Other candidates received 4.0% (158 votes cast). In the previous 2012 presidential election, Republican Mitt Romney received 68.2% of the vote (2,446 cast), ahead of Democrat Barack Obama with 31.0% (1,111 votes), and other candidates with 0.8% (29 votes), among the 3,610 ballots cast by the borough's 5,384 registered voters (24 ballots were spoiled), for a turnout of 67.1%. In the 2008 presidential election, Republican John McCain received 59.7% of the vote (2,470 cast), ahead of Democrat Barack Obama with 37.3% (1,543 votes) and other candidates with 1.3% (52 votes), among the 4,136 ballots cast by the borough's 5,303 registered voters, for a turnout of 78.0%. In the 2004 presidential election, Republican George W. Bush received 63.8% of the vote (2,590 ballots cast), outpolling Democrat John Kerry with 34.9% (1,418 votes) and other candidates with 0.8% (40 votes), among the 4,060 ballots cast by the borough's 5,084 registered voters, for a turnout percentage of 79.9.

In the 2013 gubernatorial election, Republican Chris Christie received 80.2% of the vote (1,925 cast), ahead of Democrat Barbara Buono with 18.1% (435 votes), and other candidates with 1.6% (39 votes), among the 2,438 ballots cast by the borough's 5,330 registered voters (39 ballots were spoiled), for a turnout of 45.7%. In the 2009 gubernatorial election, Republican Chris Christie received 71.6% of the vote (2,019 ballots cast), ahead of Democrat Jon Corzine with 22.8% (644 votes), Independent Chris Daggett with 4.9% (138 votes) and other candidates with 0.4% (11 votes), among the 2,819 ballots cast by the borough's 5,139 registered voters, yielding a 54.9% turnout.

Education

The Rumson School District serves public school students in pre-kindergarten through eighth grade. As of the 2018–19 school year, the district, comprised of two schools, had an enrollment of 999 students and 96.5 classroom teachers (on an FTE basis), for a student–teacher ratio of 10.4:1. Schools in the district (with 2018–19 enrollment data from the National Center for Education Statistics) are 
Deane-Porter Elementary School with 385 students in grades Pre-K–3 and 
Forrestdale Middle School with 608 students in grade 4–8.

Public school students in ninth through twelfth grades attend Rumson-Fair Haven Regional High School, a regional, four-year comprehensive public high school serving students from both Fair Haven and Rumson, where the school is located. As of the 2018–2019 school year, the high school had an enrollment of 983 students and 84.8 classroom teachers (on an FTE basis), for a student–teacher ratio of 11.6:1. In 2016, Newsweek ranked RFH the 144th best high school in the United States. Seats on the high school district's nine-member board of education are allocated based on the population of the constituent municipalities, with five seats assigned to Rumson.

Private schools in Rumson include Holy Cross School for grades K–8, which operates under the auspices of the Roman Catholic Diocese of Trenton. In 2015, Holy Cross School was one of 15 schools in New Jersey, and one of six private schools, recognized as a National Blue Ribbon School in the exemplary high performing category by the United States Department of Education.

Founded in 1926 and developed under the principles of its organizer B. Lord Buckley, Rumson Country Day School serves students in preschool through eighth grade and was recognized in 1998-99 by the National Blue Ribbon Schools Program.

Transportation

Roads and highways

No Interstate, U.S. or state highways directly serve Rumson. The most prominent road through the town is County Route 520 (Rumson Road).

Public transportation
Transportation to New York is available via NJ Transit's train service from either the Little Silver or Red Bank stations on the North Jersey Coast Line. Transportation to Newark Liberty International Airport is also available from Red Bank or Little Silver.

Many of Rumson's residents work in the financial services industry and commute to Wall Street on the high-speed SeaStreak ferry that leaves from nearby Atlantic Highlands. The ferry ride is 40 minutes to the foot of Wall Street or an hour to Midtown Manhattan.

NJ Transit offers local bus service on the 835 route.

Notable people

People who were born in, residents of, or otherwise closely associated with Rumson include:

 Edward Dean Adams (1846–1931), financier, benefactor of the Metropolitan Museum of Art, part-time resident
 Arthur Ashkin (1922–2020), scientist who won the Nobel Prize in Physics in 2018
 James C. Auchincloss (1885–1976), served eleven terms in the United States House of Representatives from 1943 to 1965 as a Republican from New Jersey's 3rd congressional district after being a member of the Rumson borough council from 1930 to 1937 and serving as Mayor of Rumson, New Jersey from 1938 to 1943, when he was elected to Congress
 Bret Baier (born 1970), host of Special Report with Bret Baier on the Fox News Channel
 William Warren Barbour (1888–1943), represented New Jersey in the United States Senate from 1931 to 1937 and 1938–1943, in addition to serving as a member of the Rumson Borough Council in 1922 and as Mayor of Rumson, New Jersey from 1923 to 1928
 Virginia Bauer (born 1956), lobbyist for families of the victims of the September 11 terror attacks who is a Commissioner of the Port Authority of New York and New Jersey
 Alfred N. Beadleston (1912–2000), served as Mayor of Shrewsbury, Speaker of the New Jersey General Assembly and President of the New Jersey Senate
 Jon Bon Jovi (born 1962), rock musician, actor and former resident, who lives along the Navesink River in Middletown (across the river from Rumson)
 Clifford G. Bond (born 1950), economist and former United States Ambassador to Bosnia and Herzegovina
 Dorothy Bond (1921–1952), soprano
 Matthew Borden (1842–1912), textile company owner
 Edward Bowes (1874–1946), creator and host of Major Bowes Amateur Hour
 Bill Britton (born 1955), professional golfer
 Martha Davis Coe (1907–1986), musician, composer, PR executive and inventor
 John M. Corlies (1868–1926), Mayor of Rumson who served on the Monmouth County Board of Chosen Freeholders
 Marshall Criser (born 1928), President of the University of Florida from 1984 to 1989
 Peter Hood Ballantine Cumming (1910–1988), Mayor of Rumson in the 1950s
 Pete Dawkins (born 1938), former U.S. Army Brigadier General, Heisman Trophy winner, Rhodes Scholar and businessman who ran in 1988 for the United States Senate seat held by Frank Lautenberg, losing 54%–46%
 Lewis Eisenberg (born 1942), United States Ambassador to Italy and San Marino since 2017
 Christian William Feigenspan (1876–1939), brewer
 Randy Foye (born 1983), NBA point guard for the Oklahoma City Thunder
 Vic Ghezzi (1910–1976), professional golfer
 James P. Gordon (1928–2013), physicist known for his work in optics and quantum electronics
 Mason Welch Gross (1911–1977), quiz show personality and academic who served as the sixteenth President of Rutgers University
 Siobhan Fallon Hogan (born 1961), actress who appeared on film in Forrest Gump, Men in Black and The Negotiator and was a former cast member of Saturday Night Live
 Kevork Hovnanian (1923–2009), businessman and home builder, founder of Hovnanian Enterprises
 Deborah Lee James (born 1958), 23rd Secretary of the Air Force
 Kristjan Järvi (born 1972), conductor
 Neeme Järvi (born 1937), Estonian-born conductor who emigrated to the United States and settled in Rumson, with his musician sons Paavo and Kristjan
 Paavo Järvi (born 1962), conductor
 James F. Kelley (1902–1996), President of Seton Hall College (now Seton Hall University) from 1936 to 1949
 Brian Kennedy, head coach for the NJIT Highlanders men's basketball team
 Queen Latifah (born 1970), actress
 Tingye Li (1931–2012), Chinese-American scientist known for his work in the fields of microwaves, lasers and optical communication
 Catarina Lindqvist (born 1963), former professional tennis player
 Heather Locklear (born 1961), actress, lived in Rumson while married to Richie Sambora
 Phyllis Stadler Lyon, former field hockey player who played om the U.S. women's national field hockey team
 Enrique Marcatili (1925–2021), winner of the IEEE's Baker Prize and pioneer in optical fiber research
 Rob Margolies (born 1983), film director and screenwriter
 Robert H. McCarter (1859–1941), New Jersey Attorney General from 1903 to 1908
 Thomas N. McCarter (1867–1955), New Jersey Attorney General from 1902 to 1903
 Jane Milmore (born 1955), playwright
 Jennifer Milmore (born 1969), actress
 Gloria Monty (1921–2006), television producer best known for her work in the field of soap operas, most notably her tenure at General Hospital
 John A. Mulheren (1949–2003), philanthropist and Wall Street financier
 Ryan Murphy (born 1983), former professional ice hockey player who was drafted by the Los Angeles Kings in the 2002 NHL Entry Draft
 Bob Ojeda (born 1957), former pitcher in the major leagues, pitched for the Mets, Yankees, Indians, Red Sox and Dodgers from 1980 to 1994
 James S. Parkes (1897–1985), politician, who served on the Red Bank Borough Council and as a member of the Monmouth County Board of Chosen Freeholders
 Rob Petitti (born 1982), offensive tackle for the New Orleans Saints of the NFL
 Charlie Puth (born 1991), singer-songwriter and record producer
 Stephen Puth (born 1994), singer-songwriter
 Jim Quirk (born ), NFL on-field official from 1988 to 2008
 James Randi (1928–2020), "The Amazing Randi", stage magician and scientific skeptic Randi lived in small house in Rumson in the 1960s, whose premises included a sign that read: "Randi — charlatan".
 Leah Ray (1915–1999), big band singer and actress
 Nelson Riddle (1921–1985), arranger and composer. Riddle spent his summers as a teen in Rumson and attended high school in Rumson during his senior year
 Bill Robinson (1918–2007), sailor and author about sailing
 Richie Sambora (born 1959), guitarist for Bon Jovi
 Patti Scialfa (born 1953), singer-songwriter
 Henry Selick (born 1952), stop motion director, producer and writer who is best known for directing The Nightmare Before Christmas, James and the Giant Peach and Coraline
 Dr. George A. Sheehan (1918–1993), cardiologist who authored numerous books on running and life, including the New York Times best seller Running & Being
 Bruce Springsteen (born 1949), rock 'n roll musician
 Melissa Stark (born 1973), television personality and sportscaster who works as a reporter for the NFL Network
 Meghan Tierney (born 1997), snowboarder who has been selected to compete in snowboardcross for the United States at the 2018 Winter Olympics in Pyeongchang
 Lynn Tilton (born 1959), businesswoman
 Sonny Werblin (1910–1991), sports executive
 Alice White (1908–2007), award-winning author, playwright, editor, teacher and performer
 James R. Zazzali (born 1937), former Chief Justice of the New Jersey Supreme Court

Gallery

References

External links

 Borough of Rumson

 
1907 establishments in New Jersey
Boroughs in Monmouth County, New Jersey
Populated places established in 1907
Borough form of New Jersey government